Deepa Kaul (born 12 April 1944, London) is an Indian politician and social worker who served as a legislator and cabinet minister in the government of Uttar Pradesh. She is the daughter of the politician Sheila Kaul and the scientist Kailas Nath Kaul, and a niece of Jawaharlal Nehru.

References

Living people
1944 births

Members of the Uttar Pradesh Legislative Assembly
Indian National Congress politicians from Uttar Pradesh